The Pinhoti Trail is a Southern Appalachian Mountains long-distance trail,  in length, located in the United States within the states of Alabama and Georgia. (The mountain is often called the southernmost Appalachian peak, though by most geological reckonings, the actual Appalachian range ends somewhat farther north in Alabama.) The trail's northern terminus is where it joins the Benton MacKaye Trail. The trails highest point is Buddy Cove Gap, with an elevation of
3164 feet near the Cohutta Wilderness. Its lowest point above sea level is close to Weogufka Creek near Weogufka State Forest at 545 feet.

The Pinhoti Trail is a part of the Eastern Continental Trail and the Great Eastern Trail, both very long-distance US hiking trails connecting multiple states.

Geographic characteristics 

History
From the Pinhoti Trail Alliance. The PTA Facebook account has the most history and current trail conditions online.

"The Pinhoti Trail is considered the realization of forester Benton MacKaye's original 1921 vision of a trail extending the length of the Appalachian Mountain chain, connecting several existing trails, and sprinkled with permanent camps and constructed to "stimulate every line of outdoor non-industrial endeavor," including recreation, recuperation, agriculture and study. He hoped to spark a "back to the land" movement to relieve the ills of urban industrial life." https://www.bhamwiki.com/w/Pinhoti_Trail

From the Georgia Pinhoti Trail Association website:

Construction of the Alabama Pinhoti Trail began in 1970 within the Talladega National Forest in east central and northeast Alabama. In 1977, the Talledega National Forest portions of the trail were designated a National Recreation Trail. By 1983,  of trail had been constructed and Mike Leonard of the Alabama Wilderness Coalition proposed connecting the Pinhoti to the Appalachian Trail in Georgia. The U.S. Forest Service and Alabama's Forever Wild land trust aided in the acquisition of major wilderness tracts. The Pinhoti Trail currently travels through some of those acquired lands and others in which it is planned to go through.

The Pinhoti Trail was initially completed in February 2008, and officially opened to the public on March 16, 2008. Efforts continue to improve the trail, mainly involving moving road walk sections of the trail onto trails away from the road. A new southern terminus of the trail at the base of Flagg Mountain, opened in March 2015.

Appalachian Trail designation
Occasionally, a small but vocal group of Alabama hiking groups have been advocating to officially designate the Pinhoti Trail as a part of the Appalachian Trail — a move that would make Flagg Mountain the southern terminus of the AT. However, these attempts have garnered a significant amount of controversy and backlash. Groups trying to push the merger forward utilized disinformation tactics and attempted to claim that Benton MacKaye wanted this and that acclaimed Alabamian hiker Nimblewill Nomad was promoting the idea. However, this was revealed to be disinformation and Nimblewill Nomad clarified his position by stating on his website that he was completely opposed to Pinhoti being made a part of the AT and that the two trails should remain separate.

Trails used in the system

 Johns Mountain Trail and the Keown Falls loop trail
 Simms Mountain Rail Trail
  The Pinhoti joins the Chief Ladiga Trail, a  rail trail, for a short portion.

Connecting trails

 The northeastern terminus is the Benton MacKaye Trail.
 Heflin Spur (3.5 miles) established in August 2018 connecting with the Pinhoti at FS 500 parking lot to Heflin City Hall.
 Chinnabee Silent Trail (8.0 miles) established in 1977 connecting with the Pinhoti at Little Caney Head in the Cheaha Wilderness to the Chinnabee Lake Recreation Area.

Public lands traversed

 Weogufka state forest
 Talladega National Forest  including the Cheaha Wilderness and the Dugger Mountain Wilderness. Talledega National Forest has  of trail in its boundaries.
  Most of the Georgia Pinhoti Trail is in the Chattahoochee National Forest.
 Indian Mountain Complex managed by Alabama's Forever Wild

See also
 List of Hiking Trails in Alabama

References

External links
Pinhoti Trail Alliance
Alabama Hiking Trail Society
Alabama Trail Association
Appalachian Trail Club of Alabama
Georgia Pinhoti Trail Association
Pinhoti Trail at The Conservation Fund

Hiking trails in Alabama
Hiking trails in Georgia (U.S. state)
Long-distance trails in the United States
National Recreation Trails in Alabama
National Recreation Trails in Georgia (U.S. state)
Chattahoochee-Oconee National Forest
Great Eastern Trail
Protected areas established in 1970
1970 establishments in Alabama
Protected areas of Alabama
Alabama placenames of Native American origin
Georgia placenames of Native American origin